Andrei Aleksandrovich Myazin (born 27 October 1987) is a Russian professional football player.

Club career
He made his Russian Football National League debut for FC Vityaz Podolsk on 27 March 2008 in a game against FC Baltika Kaliningrad.

Honours
 Russian Second Division Zone Centre best player: 2010.

External links
 
 

1987 births
Sportspeople from Samara, Russia
Living people
Russian footballers
Association football forwards
FC Olimpia Volgograd players
FC Volgar Astrakhan players
FC Petrotrest players
FC Vityaz Podolsk players
FC Ufa players
FC Rotor Volgograd players
FC Luch Vladivostok players
FC Shinnik Yaroslavl players
FC Armavir players
FK Palanga players
FC Avangard Kursk players
FC Lada-Tolyatti players
Russian First League players
Russian Second League players
A Lyga players
Russian expatriate footballers
Expatriate footballers in Lithuania
Russian expatriate sportspeople in Lithuania